The 1983 Eastern Illinois Panthers football team was an American football team that represented Eastern Illinois University as a member of the Association of Mid-Continent Universities (Mid-Con) during the 1983 NCAA Division I-AA football season. Led by first-year head coach Al Molde, the Panthers compiled an overall record of 9–3 with a mark of 3–0 in conference play, winning the Mid-Con title. Eastern Illinois was invited to the NCAA Division I-AA Football Championship playoffs, where they lost Indiana State in the first round.

Schedule

References

Eastern Illinois
Eastern Illinois Panthers football seasons
Eastern Illinois Panthers football
Association of Mid-Continent Universities football champion seasons